Malchin Peak ("Herder peak") is the one of five peaks of the Tavan Bogd mountain on the Mongolia-Russian border. The Peak towers at the elevation of 4,050 m (13,287 ft). It is the only one of the fiver peaks of Tavan Bogd that can be climbed without specialized mountain climbing equipment.

See also 
 Khüiten Peak
 Nairamdal Peak

References 

Mountains of Mongolia
Altai Mountains